Steven Heine (born 1950), is a scholar in the field of Zen Buddhist history and thought, particularly the life and teachings of Zen Master Dōgen (1200–1253). He has also taught and published extensively on Japanese religion and society in worldwide perspectives.

Teaching and research career
Heine lectured at Villanova University in Religious Studies from 1982 to 1987. In 1987, he became an Assistant Professor of Religion at La Salle University and taught there until 1991 when he moved to Penn State University and became an Associate Professor of Religious Studies. He left Penn State University in 1997 to work as director of Florida International University's Asian Studies Program. Since his arrival at FIU, Heine has expanded Asian Studies and helped facilitate its growth at both the undergraduate and graduate levels. The program also has an extensive outreach component. He is editor of the Japan Studies Review and a review editor for Philosophy East and West.

Publications

Dogen Studies 
 A Blade of Grass: Japanese Poetry and Aesthetics in Dogen Zen (Peter Lang Publishing, 1989)
A Study of Dogen: His Philosophy and Religion (SUNY, 1991)
Dogen and the Koan Tradition: A Tale of Two Shobogenzo Texts (SUNY, 1993)
 Did Dogen Go to China? What He Wrote and When He Wrote It? (Oxford University Press, 2006)
 Dogen and Soto Zen (Oxford University Press, 2015)
Dogen: Japan’s Original Zen Teacher (Shambhala Publications, 2021)

History and Thought of Zen Buddhism
 Opening a Mountain: Koans of the Zen Masters (Oxford University Press, 2003)
Like Cats and Dogs: Contesting the Mu Koan in Zen Buddhism (Oxford University Press, 2013)
Chan Rhetoric of Uncertainty in the Blue Cliff Record: Sharpening the Sword at the Dragon's Gate (Oxford University Press, 2016)
 From Chinese Chan to Japanese Zen: A Remarkable Century of Transmission and Transformation (Oxford University Press, 2017)

Asian Religion in Contemporary Culture: East & West
 Bargainin' For Salvation: Bob Dylan, A Zen Master? (Continuum, 2009)
 Sacred High City, Sacred Low City: A Tale of Religious Sites in Two Tokyo Neighborhoods (Oxford University Press, 2011)

Co-Edited Series with Dale S. Wright
 The Koan: Texts and Contexts in Zen Buddhism (Oxford University Press, 2000)
 Zen Masters (Oxford University Press, 2010)

Honours and awards 
Heine is the recipient of the Order of the Rising Sun, Gold Rays with Rosette for his contribution to Japanese Studies.

A festschrift – as a tribute to honour Heine's contributions in the field of studies on Zen Buddhism – has been published in 2022 – with contributions of many of his colleagues.

References

External links
 https://religion.fiu.edu/faculty/full-time-faculty/steven-heine/

Year of birth missing (living people)
Living people
American philosophy academics
American religion academics
American Buddhist studies scholars
Villanova University faculty
Florida International University faculty
Writers from Miami
Zen Buddhism writers
Recipients of the Order of the Rising Sun, 4th class